Cheremule is a comune (municipality) in the Province of Sassari in the Italian region Sardinia, located about  north of Cagliari and about  southeast of Sassari.

Cheremule borders the following municipalities: Borutta, Cossoine, Giave, Thiesi, Torralba.

References

Cities and towns in Sardinia